Brown or brown people is a racial and ethnic term. Like black people and white people, it is a term for race based  on human skin color.

In the age of scientific racism 

In the 18th and 19th century, European and American writers proposed geographically based "scientific" differences among "the races." Many of these racial models assigned colors to the groups described, and some included a "brown race" as in the following:

 In the late 18th century, German anthropologist Johann Blumenbach extended Linnaeus's four-color race model by adding the brown race, "Malay race", which included both the Malay division of Austronesian (Southern-Thailand, Cambodia, Indonesia, Philippines, Malaysia, Brunei, Pattani, Sumatra, Madagascar, Formosans, etc.) and Polynesians and Melanesians of Pacific Islands, as well as Papuans and Aborigines of Australia.
 In 1775, "John Hunter of Edinburg included under the label light brown, Southern Europeans, Italians, the Spanish, Persians, Turks and Laplanders, under the label brown."
 Jean Baptiste Julien d'Omalius d'Halloy's five-race scheme differed from Blumenbach's by including Ethiopians in the brown race, as well as Oceanic peoples. Louis Figuier adopted and adapted d'Omalius d'Halloy's classification and also included Egyptians in the brown race.
 In 1915, Donald Mackenzie conceived a "Mediterranean or Brown race, the eastern branch of which reaches to India and the western to the British Isles... [and includes] predynastic Egyptians... [and some populations of] Neolithic man".

 Eugenicist Lothrop Stoddard in his The Rising Tide of Color Against White World-Supremacy (1920) mapped a "brown race" as native to North Africa, the Horn of Africa, the Caucasus, the Near East, Middle East, Central Asia, South Asia, Southeast Asia, and Austronesia (Malay race). Stoddard's "brown" is one of five "primary races", contrasting with "white", "black", "yellow" and "Amerindian".
 Due to what he considered the relatively close physical relationship between many populations "from the Red Sea as far as India, including Semites as well as Hamites", Grafton Elliot Smith conceived the Brown Race as a natural extension of Giuseppe Sergi's earlier Mediterranean race concept. In this popular conception, the Brown Race consisted of a joint "Mediterranean-Hamite-Semite" grouping of ancestrally related peoples, into which Elliot Smith included the Proto-Egyptians.
These and other race theories have been dismissed scientifically. As a 2012 human biology textbook observes, "These claims of race-based taxonomy, including [Carleton] Coon's claims for homo-sapienation, have been discredited by paleontological and genomic research showing the antiquity of modern human origins, as well as the essential genomic African nature of all living human beings."

Subdivisions 
In the 19th century, the notion of a single "brown people" was sometimes superseded by multiple "brown peoples."  Cust mentions Grammar in 1852 denying that there was one single "brown race", but in fact, several races speaking distinct languages.  The 1858 Cyclopaedia of India and of eastern and southern Asia notes that Keane was dividing the "brown people" into quaternion: a western branch that he termed the Malay, a north-western group that he termed the Micronesian, and the peoples of the eastern archipelagos that he termed the Maori and the Polynesian.

Ethnic and racial identifier 
The appellation "brown people" has been applied in the 20th and 21st centuries to several groups. Edward Telles, a sociologist of race and ethnicity, and Jack Forbes both argue that this classification is biologically invalid. However, as Telles notes, it is still of sociological significance.  Irrespective of the actual biological differences amongst humans, and of the actual complexities of human skin coloration, people nonetheless self-identify as "brown" and identify other groups of people as "brown", using characteristics that include skin color, hair strength, language, and culture, in order to classify them.

Forbes remarks upon a process of "lumping", whereby characteristics other than skin color, such as hair color or curliness, act as "triggers" for color categories "even when it may not be appropriate."

Ethnicity in South Africa 

In 1950s (and later) South Africa, the "brown people" were the Coloureds, referring to those born of multiracial sexual unions out of wedlock. They were distinct from the Reheboth Basters inhabiting Namibia, who were primarily of Khoisan and European parentage. The Afrikaans terms, which incorporate many subtleties of heritage, political agenda, and identity, are "bruin" ("brown"), "bruines" ("browns"), and "bruinmense" ("brown people"). Some South Africans prefer the appellation "bruinmense" to "Coloured".

The South African pencil test was one example of a characteristic other than skin color being used as a determiner. The pencil test, which distinguished either "black" from "Coloured" or "Coloured" from "white", relied upon curliness and strength of hair (i.e. whether it was capable of retaining a pencil under its own strength) rather than upon any color factor at all.  The pencil test could "trump skin color".

Steve Biko, in his trial in 1976, rejected the appellation "brown people" when it was put to him incorrectly by Judge Boshoff:
Boshoff: But now why do you refer to you people as blacks?  Why not brown people?  I mean you people are more brown than black.
Biko: In the same way as I think white people are more pink and yellow and pale than white.
Boshoff: Quite ... but now why do you not use the word brown then?
Biko: No, I think really, historically, we have been defined as black people, and when we reject the term non-white and take upon ourselves the right to call ourselves what we think we are, we have got available in front of us a whole number of alternatives ... and we choose this one precisely because we feel it is most accommodating.

Penelope Oakes characterizes Biko's argument as picking "black" over "brown" because for Biko it is "the most valid, meaningful and appropriate representation, even though in an individualistic decontextualized sense it might appear wrong" (Oakes's emphasis).

This contrasts with Piet Uithalder, the fictional protagonist of the satirical column "Straatpraatjes" (whose actual author was never revealed but who is believed to have been Abdullah Abdurahman)  that appeared in the Dutch-Afrikaans section of the newspaper APO between May 1909 and February 1922.  Uithalder would self-identify as a Coloured person, with the column targeted at a Coloured readership, introducing himself as "een van de ras" ("a member of the race") and characterizing himself as a "bruine mens".

Pardos in Brazil 

In popular use, Brazilians also use a category of moreno m. , morena f. , lit. 'swarthy', from mouro, Portuguese for 'Moor', which were perceived as those with darker phenotypes than European peoples, so a moreno or morena is a person with a "Moorish" phenotype), which is extremely ambiguous, as it can mean "dark-haired people", but is also used as a euphemism for pardo, and even "black". In a 1995 survey, 32% of the population self-identified as moreno, with a further 6% self-identifying as moreno claro ("light moreno"). 7% self-identified as "pardo".

A comprehensive study presented by the Brazilian Journal of Medical and Biological Research found that on average, 'white' Brazilians have >50% European genomic ancestry, whereas 'black' Brazilians have 17.1% European genomic ancestry. It concluded that "The high ancestral variability observed in Whites and Blacks suggests that each Brazilian has a singular and quite individual proportion of European, African and Amerindian ancestry in their mosaic genomes. Thus, the only possible basis to deal with genetic variation in Brazilians is not by considering them as members of color groups, but on a person-by-person basis, as 190 million human beings, with singular genome and life histories".

Use in Canada 
Relating to brown identity, the popular usage of the term in Canada generally refers to individuals of South Asian and Middle Eastern ancestry.

Use in the United States 

"Brown" has been used as a term in popular culture for some South Asian Americans, Middle Eastern Americans and Latino Americans either as a pejorative term or sometimes for self-identification, as with brown identity. Judith Ortiz Cofer notes that appellation varies according to geographical location, observing that in Puerto Rico she is considered to be a white person, but in the United States mainland, she is considered to be a "brown person." Moustafa Bayoumi, an Egyptian-American professor of English at Brooklyn College, identified himself as a "brown Arab-American" in an opinion piece criticizing the United States Census for forcing self-identified brown persons to identify as white. 

The term "Brown American" has been used both as a term of insult and as self-identification in referring to Filipino Americans. Furthermore, some Americans of Southeast Asian or South Asian descent have used the terms "Brown Asian" or "Brown South Asian" to separate themselves from East Asian Americans, who are largely synonymous with the United States view of Asian Americans.

Brown pride 
Brown pride is a movement primarily in the United States among Latinos to develop a positive self-image by embracing the idea of being brown as a form of pride. Brown pride is a response to the racist or colorist narrative that white skin is more beautiful than brown skin. Brown pride first emerged among Mexican Americans in the United States alongside the Chicano and Black is Beautiful movement in the 1960s.

Media portrayals of brown people 
In the United States, mainstream media has sometimes referenced brown as a racial classification that is a threat to white America and the idea of 'America' in general. This has been done through rhetoric of a "brown tide" that is changing the demographic landscape of the United States, often with an underlying negative tone. This may stoke racial fears of people, and particularly Latinos, who are seen as brown.

See also 
 Bronze (racial classification)
 Racism
 Discrimination based on skin color
 Melting pot

References

Further reading 
 

Ethnonyms
Race (human categorization)
Scientific racism
Person of color